American Legion State Forest is a Connecticut state forest that sits on the West Branch Farmington River opposite Peoples State Forest in the town of Barkhamsted.

History
The forest's first 213 acres were given to the state by the American Legion in 1927. The forest was developed in the 1930s by the Civilian Conservation Corps.

Activities and amenities
The forest's recreational offerings include canoeing on the Farmington River and hiking on the American Legion State Forest Trails system which includes the Henry Buck and Turkey Vultures Ledges trails. Camping is offered at the Austin F. Hawes Memorial Campground by the banks of the river.

References

Further reading
American Legion State Forest Trails Connecticut Museum Quest

External links

American Legion and Peoples State Forests Connecticut Department of Energy and Environmental Protection
American Legion and Peoples State Forests Map Connecticut Department of Energy and Environmental Protection

Connecticut state forests
Parks in Litchfield County, Connecticut
Barkhamsted, Connecticut
Civilian Conservation Corps in Connecticut
1927 establishments in Connecticut
Protected areas established in 1927